Remich is a canton in the east of Luxembourg. Its capital is Remich.

Administrative divisions
Remich Canton consists of the following eight communes:

 Bous
 Dalheim
 Lenningen
 Mondorf-les-Bains
 Remich
 Schengen
 Stadtbredimus
 Waldbredimus

Mergers
 On 1 January 2012 the former communes of Burmerange and Wellenstein (both from Remich Canton) were absorbed into the commune of Schengen. The law expanding Schengen was passed on 30 May 2011.

Population

References

 
Cantons of Luxembourg